Aloysio Borges (18 December 1917 – 27 November 1996) was a Brazilian modern pentathlete and épée fencer. He competed at the 1948 and 1952 Summer Olympics.

References

External links
 

1917 births
1996 deaths
Brazilian male modern pentathletes
Olympic modern pentathletes of Brazil
Modern pentathletes at the 1948 Summer Olympics
Modern pentathletes at the 1952 Summer Olympics
Pan American Games silver medalists for Brazil
Pan American Games medalists in modern pentathlon
Brazilian male épée fencers
Pan American Games medalists in fencing
Modern pentathletes at the 1963 Pan American Games
Fencers at the 1963 Pan American Games
20th-century Brazilian people